Shaik Basha (born 22 May 1993) is an Indian first-class cricketer who plays for Andhra Pradesh.

References

External links
 

1993 births
Living people
Indian cricketers
Andhra cricketers
Cricketers from Andhra Pradesh
People from Guntur district